Hell Is a City is a 1954 crime novel by the British writer Maurice Procter. It was the first in a series featuring Chief Inspector Harry Martineau, set in the Northern industrial city of Granchester. It takes the form of a police procedural, and marked a transition away from the traditional Golden Age detective novel.  Published by Hutchinson, it was released in the United States by Harper the same year under the alternative title Somewhere in This City.

Film version
In 1960 the novel was adapted into a British film of the same title directed by Val Guest and starring Stanley Baker, John Crawford and Donald Pleasence.

References

Bibliography
 Dove, George N. The Police Procedural. Popular Press, 1982.
 Goble, Alan. The Complete Index to Literary Sources in Film. Walter de Gruyter, 1999.
 Herbert, Rosemary. Whodunit?: A Who's Who in Crime & Mystery Writing. Oxford University Press, 2003.
 Reilly, John M. Twentieth Century Crime & Mystery Writers. Springer, 2015.
 Vicarel, Jo Ann. A Reader's Guide to the Police Procedural. G.K. Hall, 1995. 

1954 British novels
Novels by Maurice Procter
British crime novels
British thriller novels
Hutchinson (publisher) books
Novels set in England
British novels adapted into films